Out of This World is Maureen McGovern's ninth studio album (and first in four years), released in 1996.

This is a cover album of 16 songs that were written or co-written by Harold Arlen. The third track is a two-song medley, and the twelfth track is a three-song medley. The album was reissued in November 2003 with two bonus tracks: "Let's Fall in Love" and "Optimistic Voices".

Track listing

Album credits
Produced by Maureen McGovern and Brian Panella
Executive producer: Pat Moran
Arranged by: Mike Renzi ("Stormy Weather" and "Blues in the Night" based on piano arrangement by John Oddo)
Piano and keyboards: Mike Renzi
Bass: Jay Leonhart
Alto sax, soprano saxophones, flutes: Lou Marini
Drums: Allan Schwartzberg
Acoustic and electric guitars: Joe Beck
Percussion and vibes: James Saporito
Percussion: Cyro Baptista
Synth programmers: Jamie Lawrence, Ken Bichel
Digitally recorded, mixed and mastered by Ed Rak at Clinton Recording Studios, New York, NY
Music copying and contracting: Kaye - Houston Music

1996 albums
Maureen McGovern albums
Covers albums